Grit Naumann  (born ) is a retired German female volleyball player. She was part of the Germany women's national volleyball team at the 1988 Summer Olympics and the 1996 Summer Olympics.

She participated in the 1994 FIVB Volleyball Women's World Championship. On club level she played with CJD Berlino.

In 1994 she became the German Volleyball Player of the Year.

Clubs
 CJD Berlino (1994)

References

External links

1966 births
Living people
German women's volleyball players
Place of birth missing (living people)
Volleyball players at the 1988 Summer Olympics
Volleyball players at the 1996 Summer Olympics
Olympic volleyball players of East Germany
Olympic volleyball players of Germany
20th-century German women
21st-century German women